Loïc Jacquet (born 31 March 1985 in Saint-Doulchard, Cher) is a French rugby union player who plays as a lock. He has so far spent his whole professional career in Clermont-Ferrand.

Jacquet was the captain of the French team that won the 2006 U21 World Cup.
On 18 November 2006 he received his first cap against New Zealand. He played only one other game under Bernard Laporte but was called up by Marc Lièvremont for the first game of the 2008 Six Nations Championship against Scotland.

In 2010 he was selected in the French Barbarians squad to play Tonga on 26 November.

Honours
 Clermont Auvergne
European Challenge Cup: (2007)
 Castres
Top 14: 2017–18

References

Living people
1985 births
ASM Clermont Auvergne players
French rugby union players
Rugby union locks
France international rugby union players